Mark Dudzic is the National Organizer and Chairman of the United States Labor Party as well as a labor activist. For 18 years, prior to becoming Labor Party Chairman, Dudzic was president of  Local 8-149 OCAW (a branch of the Oil, Chemical and Atomic Workers International Union). He is also the national coordinator for the Labor Campaign for Single Payer, which advocates for single-payer health care. He is a member of the Democratic Socialists of America.

References

External links
Labor Party Biography

American trade unionists
Labor Party (United States, 1996) politicians
Members of the Democratic Socialists of America
Living people
Year of birth missing (living people)